James Brown (May 19, 1800 – March 10, 1855) was an American publisher and co-founder of Little, Brown and Company.

Biography
Brown was born in Acton, Massachusetts. He started his working life as a servant in the family of Prof. Levi Hedge, of Cambridge, by whom he was instructed in the classics and in mathematics. Around 1832, he worked for booksellers Hilliard, Gray & Co. on Washington Street in Boston, along with William Hilliard, Harrison Gray, and J.H. Wilkins. He was originally hired by Hilliard as a clerk. That firm was dissolved after the death of one of the partners and Brown went to work for Charles C. Little & Co., run by Charles Coffin Little, also a former clerk. In 1837, the firm became Charles C. Little and James Brown, and Brown remained there until his death. Augustus Flagg joined them in 1838 and would become managing partner after the deaths of the two founders.

The firm's name was changed to Little, Brown and Company in 1847. In 1853 Little, Brown began publishing the works of British poets from Chaucer to Wordsworth. There were ninety-six volumes published in the series in five years, but Brown did not live to see its completion. He died in Watertown, Massachusetts on March 10, 1855.

His son John Murray Brown took over when Flagg retired in 1884. A life of James Brown, by George Stillman Hillard, was published in Boston in 1855.

References

1800 births
1855 deaths
American book publishers (people)
19th century in Boston
People from Acton, Massachusetts
19th-century American businesspeople